Hoya kerrii, also referred to colloquially as Hoya hearts, is a species of Hoya native to the south-east of Asia. Its eponymous collector is Arthur Francis George Kerr, Irish physician and botanist.

As the thick leaves are heart-shaped, the plant is sometimes named "lucky-heart". In Europe, it is sold for Saint Valentine's Day.

Its origin area is South China, Vietnam, Laos, Cambodia, Thailand and the Indonesian island of Java.

Description
Hoya kerrii is a climbing plant that can grow up to 4 meters high (around 13 feet). Stems have a diameter of 7 mm. The leaves are 6 cm wide, 5 mm thick.
Adult plants show inflorescences of 5 cm diameter and up to 25 flowers. They produce small balls of nectar, coloured red to brown. They smell only faintly or not at all.

Taxonomy
A specimen was collected by Arthur Francis George Kerr 1910 in or 1911 in the Doi Suthep mountains west of Chiang Mai (Northern Thailand) at an altitude of 390 m above sea level. It was transplanted to Kew Gardens where it flowered in August 1911, and the species was first described by William Grant Craib from that plant and the wild collections in 1911.

Culture as houseplant
It can be difficult to find a fully vined Hoya kerri at a reasonable price.  Garden centres and large box stores often stock Hoya kerrii as a single leaf cutting.  The cutting's heart shape makes it a popular purchase for Valentine's day. The leaf readily roots and remains a planted heart for many months if not years.  These are largely considered novelty items as very few single leaf cuttings develop into mature plants.  In order for a leaf cutting to sprout a vine, part of the stem and a node is required from the mother plant.  Even if a stem and node are present, it can take several years before new growth is observed.

References

kerrii
Taxa named by William Grant Craib